Motaalleq Mahalleh-ye Arbastan (also Romanized as Mota‘alleq Maḩalleh-ye Ārbāstān; also known as Mota‘alleq Maḩalleh-ye Langerūd) is a village in Shirju Posht Rural District, Rudboneh District, Lahijan County, Gilan Province, Iran. At the 2006 census, its population was 72, in 25 families.

References 

Populated places in Lahijan County